Pittokopos (Greek: Πιττόκοπος) is a locality in Dhrousha in Cyprus, in the Paphos District.

Topography 
Pittokopos, Paphos district is a locality and is north of Lefki and southeast of Fásli. Pittokopos has an elevation of 423 metres and is nearby to Agía Aféntrika.

Nearby Places 
Dhrousha (2.3 km), Inia (2.4 km), Androlykou (3.4 km), Terra (4.5 km), Kritou Terra (4.9 km)

Nearby Cities: Polis Chrysochous

Post Code 
Pittokopos Post Code is 8705

References 

Populated places in Paphos District